Akhbare Islamia was a late 19th-century Bengali-language magazine. It was published monthly, and funded by the Zamindars of Karatia in Tangail. The magazine mainly discussed subjects relating to the Sharia (Islamic law), Islamic theology, biographies of Muslims, Islamic culture as well as contemporary social and religious issues.

History
The Akhbare Islamia was founded in April 1884 by Hafez Mahmud Ali Khan Panni, the erstwhile zamindar (feudal lord) of Karatia. The magazine was edited by Mohammad Naimuddin, a Muslim theologian and poet. It was published until 1894 and restarted publication in April 1896 with a different format. However, it was permanently disbanded not long after.

Content
The magazine was part of an Islamic revival in Bengal that promoted orthodox Islam and discouraged religious syncretism that was common among Bengali Muslims. The movement was fundamentalist in nature that discouraged secular books and music. It had legal disputes with its contemporary The Ahmadi, a secular Muslim magazine, regarding the killing of cows and Hanafi-Lamazhabi dialogue.

References

1884 establishments in India
Bengali-language magazines
Defunct magazines published in Bangladesh
Islamic magazines
Magazines established in 1884
Magazines with year of disestablishment missing